Solo is the name of several card games as well as contracts within certain games:

 English Solo, another name for Solo Whist, often just called Solo
 German Solo, German version of Quadrille and relative of Ombre, often just called Solo
 American Solo, another name for Six Bid Solo
 Other names for American Solo:
 Denver Solo
 Salt Lake Solo
 Variants of American Solo:
 Progressive Solo
 Variants of the American card game of Frog:
 Straight Solo
 Slough (card game), also just called Solo
 Coeur d'Alene Solo